Thomas or Tom Lowe may refer to:

Thomas Lowe (tenor) (1719–1783), English opera singer and actor
Thomas Lowe (priest) (1781–1861), Anglican Dean of Exeter
Thomas Lowe (politician) (1812–1875), mayor of Atlanta, 1861
Thomas Hunter Lowe (1928–1984), American judge and politician in Maryland
Thomas Lowe (millwright) (fl. 18th century), of Piccadilly Mill
Tom Lowe (writer) (fl. 1998–2010), writer and filmmaker from Southern California
Tom Lowe (radio) (born 1975), British radio broadcaster
Tom Lowe (performer) (born 1978), English-born singer and actor who featured on American Idol
Thomas Lowe (Lord Mayor) (died 1623), English politician and Lord Mayor of London in 1604
Tom Lowe (cricketer) (1859–1934), English cricketer